Aate Olkkonen (18 June 1877 – 29 April 1949) was a Finnish politician, born in Haapajärvi. He was a Member of the Parliament of Finland from 1907 to 1908, representing the Finnish Party.

References

1877 births
1949 deaths
People from Haapajärvi
People from Oulu Province (Grand Duchy of Finland)
Finnish Party politicians
Members of the Parliament of Finland (1907–08)